Claremont McKenna College (CMC) is a private liberal arts college in Claremont, California. It has a curricular emphasis on government, economics, public affairs, finance, and international relations. CMC is a member of the Claremont Colleges consortium.

Founded as a men's college in 1946, CMC became coeducational in 1976. The college focuses primarily on undergraduate education, but in 2007 it established the Robert Day School of Economics and Finance, which offers a master's program in finance. CMC is known for its faculty's conservative political orientation relative to comparable liberal arts colleges. , there were 1,338 undergraduate students and postgraduate students.

CMC competes in the NCAA Division III's Southern California Intercollegiate Athletic Conference (SCIAC) conference in a joint athletic program with Harvey Mudd College and Scripps College.

History

Early history 
Claremont McKenna College was founded as Claremont Men's College in September 1946 with a founding class of 86 students and seven faculty. Many of its first students were war veterans of World War II attending college on the G.I. Bill. Claremont Men's College was the third Claremont College, following Pomona College and Scripps College. CMC founded with the mission to foster leadership in its students in the fields of government, economics, and international affairs. The college's motto is "Crescit cum commercio civitas", or "Civilization prospers with commerce".

Coeducation issues 

Following a national trend toward coeducation among colleges such as Yale, Williams, Amherst and Dartmouth, Claremont Men's College faced compelling arguments to admit women in the 1970s. With support from students represented by the Associated Students of Claremont's Men College, the trustees of the college voted to admit women to CMC with a two-thirds vote. A year later, in 1976 Claremont Men's College admitted the first women to their freshman class. Jack Stark, the president of Claremont Men's College during this transition, would later say the admission of women was the college's most important moment. The women of the earliest classes of CMC are known as "Pioneers" and graduated with degrees that still bore the "Claremont's Mens College" moniker. It wasn't until 1981 that the college was renamed Claremont McKenna College after Donald McKenna, a founding trustee.

In November 1989, a father of a CMC student hired a stripper to perform in the college's dining hall, sparking protests among some students. Then-president Jack Stark told The New York Times he did not wish to comment on "whether [the incident] was or was not degrading to women".

2000s 
On September 27, 2007, the college announced a $200 million gift from alumnus and trustee Robert Addison Day to create the "Robert Day Scholars Program" and a master's program in finance. CMC literature professor Robert Faggen sent a letter signed by several other literature professors to CMC president Pamela Gann, saying they were concerned that the gift will "distort the college into a single focus trade school." In June 2020, RePEc ranked the college's economics department, the Robert Day School, as #4 in its list of top US Economics Departments at Liberal Arts Colleges.

On January 30, 2012, President Gann revealed that a "high-ranking admissions official," later identified as the school's former dean of admissions, Richard C. Vos, had been inflating SAT scores reported to the U.S. News & World Report by 10–20 points over the previous six years. A 2013 Time article opined that "such a small differential could not have significantly affected U.S. News & World Report rankings". A report commissioned by the college claimed to have found no evidence that these misrepresentations were made to inflate the school's rankings. The controversy prompted Forbes to omit CMC from its annual rankings in 2013.

In November 2015, the college made national news when the dean of students resigned after students protested what they called a lack of institutional resources for marginalized students; the dean had implied in an email that minority students didn't fit the "CMC mold" (the dean had sent the student an email stating: 
 
and her response to an incident of allegedly culturally appropriative Halloween costumes was seen as lacking. These protests closely followed and were associated with the 2015 University of Missouri protests.

On April 6, 2017, a group of approximately 300 student protesters (many of whom attended the other Claremont Colleges) blockaded the Marian Miner Cook Athenaeum in an attempt to shut down a speech by conservative pundit Heather Mac Donald. The college livestreamed the talk, as audiences were unable to enter the building. The college disciplined seven of its students who participated in the blockade, including suspending two for a semester and three for a full year.

In 2021, the Foundation for Individual Rights in Education ranked CMC #1 out of all colleges and universities in the United States for free speech.

Campus

The predominant architectural style of CMC's campus is California modernism, reflecting the style popular at the time of the college's founding in the 1940s. In recent years, the older, more pedestrian and utilitarian buildings have begun to be replaced by new, more ostentatious constructions, namely the Kravis Center at the western edge of campus and the $70million Roberts Pavilion athletics center.

Organization and administration 
CMC is chartered as a private, non-profit organization and is a member of the seven-institution Claremont Colleges consortium. Students can take classes at any of the member colleges, and the colleges share libraries, student health, a bookstore, athletic facilities, and various student services. The privately appointed, 40-voting-member board of trustees elects a president to serve as chief executive officer of the college. Hiram Chodosh is CMC's fifth president. The president has an executive cabinet of 9 vice presidents, including a VP of Students Affairs and VP of Academic Affairs.

Presidents 
 George C. S. Benson, founding president (1946–1969)
 Howard R. Neville (1969–1970)
 Jack L. Stark (1970–1999)
 Pamela Gann (1999–2013)
Hiram Chodosh (2013–present)

Academics

Rankings 
U.S. News & World Reports 2021 rankings rated Claremont McKenna 6th-best liberal arts college in the United States. Wall Street Journal/Times Higher Education US College Rankings 2020 ranked Claremont Mckenna as the 6th-best liberal arts college. In 2017, Forbes ranked Claremont McKenna as the 13th-best among 650 colleges, universities and service academies in the nation. Claremont McKenna is the 10th-most selective college in the nation according to collegesimply. Claremont McKenna is ranked 30th nationally in "Best Universities and Colleges by Salary Potential" by Payscale.

Admissions 

CMC is classified as "most selective" by U.S. News & World Report. For the incoming class of 2024, CMC accepted 633 applicants (11.2%) from a pool of 5,632.

Financial aid 
Tuition for the 2018–2019 school year is $54,160 ($27,080 per semester) for a full-time student, and room and board is on average $15,930 ($7,965 per semester for double room and 12 meals per week), for a total annual cost of attendance of $70,212.50 with other expected costs included. CMC admits students on a need-blind basis and guarantees to meet the financial need of all its students as determined by the FAFSA and the College Board's CSS Profile. For the 2016–2017 year, CMC awarded a total of $27,021,024 in financial aid. 38.9% of students received need-based financial aid with an average total grant aid package of $42,445, while 5.8% of students received merit aid, with an average award of $15,744.

The college, which operates on a semester system, has 12 academic departments, 11 research institutes and 33 on-campus majors, the most popular of which are economics, government, psychology, economics-accounting and international relations. However, as a member of the Claremont Colleges, students at CMC also have the option to study any major that is not offered at CMC given that one of the other colleges has such a major. A popular example is computer science, which is offered by both Harvey Mudd College and Pomona College. The student to faculty ratio is 8:1 with an average class size of 18. 85% of the classes have fewer than 19 students. The six-year graduation rate is 93.3%, and the freshman retention rate is 92.7%.

Curriculum 
About one third of the classes students complete are general education requirements. These include a humanities seminar and a writing seminar their first year, three semesters of a foreign language or demonstrated proficiency, a mathematics or computer science course, one laboratory science course and three semesters of a P.E. course or two seasons on a sports team. In addition, students must complete at least two humanities courses and three social science courses, all in areas outside the student's major. All students must complete a senior thesis, which can be either one-semester in length or, to receive departmental honors, two semesters. Claremont McKenna's curricular emphasis is on its social sciences, particularly economics, government, international relations, and psychology. CMC also offers an Oxford-style tutorial Philosophy, Politics, and Economics major with two separate tracks of 14 students each. Other multi-disciplinary majors include management engineering, philosophy and public affairs, science and management, econ-accounting, biology-chemistry, and environment, economics, and politics (EEP). CMC also offers the Robert A. Day 4+1 BA/MBA, in which students receive both their BA from Claremont McKenna and their MBA from the Drucker School of Management at Claremont Graduate University in 5 years. Its most popular undergraduate majors, by 2021 graduates, were:
Economics (90)
Multi-/Interdisciplinary Studies (27)
Political Science and Government (24)
Computer Science (17)
Experimental Psychology (16)
International Relations and Affairs (16)

CMC's science program is currently offered through the Keck Science Department of Claremont McKenna, Pitzer and Scripps Colleges. The Keck Science Department offers a double year-long introductory science class to allow more flexibility than the former 3 year-long introductory biology, chemistry and physics courses that most science majors must complete. In October 2018, CMC announced that it plans to withdraw from Keck to create its own science department.

Many CMC students study abroad or participate in one of two domestic programs, one in Washington, D.C. and the other in the Silicon Valley. In both of these programs, students complete a full-time internship with a business or government department, remaining full-time students taught at night by CMC professors stationed in the two locations".

More than 75% percent of students attend graduate school within five years of graduation, and those who choose to go straight to the workforce average a starting salary of $57,156 for the class of 2014, with average signing bonuses averaging $7,905. Of those CMC graduates applying to medical school, 80% get into their first or second choice institutions.

Campus life 

CMC is known for its active party scene and relatively lenient policies on alcohol use. Although the college's social scene draws students from the other schools in the consortium and is enjoyed by many, it has also drawn criticism. A 2012 Campus Climate Task Force report published by the school described a "pervasive, 'hyper-masculine' and heteronormative ethos at CMC" and noted that "while female students are valued as friends and intellectual colleagues during the day, at night and particularly on the weekends, female students reportedly feel they are objectified targets for sex or 'hook-ups.'" Since 2015, CMC and the other consortium schools have ramped up efforts to reform this culture, including hiring a dedicated Title IX staff member, creating the 7c EmPOWER Center, conducting bystander training under the Teal Dot certification and the establishing a student-run advocates organization that provides 24/7 support for victims of sexual assault.

There is also an abundance of substance-free social programming available for students, notably including events planned by the College Programming Board such as the annual Disneyland trip as well as other on-campus events like arts and service events.

As of fall 2019, student enrollment consisted of 1,335 degree-seeking undergraduate students. The median family income of CMC students is $201,300, the second-highest in California, with 58% of students coming from the top 10% highest-earning families and 15% from the bottom 60%. The student body is roughly equally split between men and women, and 21% of students are first-generation. 95% freshman return for their second year.
Students hail from 47 US states, D.C., Puerto Rico, Guam, and 46 foreign countries, including 16% of students who identify as nonresident alien.

The Claremont Colleges 
Claremont McKenna College is a member of the Claremont Colleges Consortium, and most social activities revolve around the five colleges, or "5Cs". Claremont McKenna College, Pomona College,  Scripps College, Pitzer College, and Harvey Mudd College share dining halls, libraries, and other facilities throughout the contiguous campuses. All five colleges, along with Claremont Graduate University and the Keck Graduate Institute, are part of the Claremont University Consortium. Notable benefits of being in the consortium include equal access to seven dining halls and 10 additional on-campus eateries, the fifth largest private library collection in California, interaction with over 7,000 students, access to programs such as Harvey Mudd's Clinic Program and Claremont McKenna's Semester in Washington (DC) program, and the opportunity to do a housing exchange with a student at another college. Most events sponsored by each school are open to students from all of the Claremont Colleges, including invited speakers and performers, employment and recruiting events, and social events.

Marian Miner Cook Athenaeum 
The Marian Miner Cook Athenaeum hosts more than one hundred dinner and lecture events with speakers representing a range of disciplines and ideological perspectives each year, serving as the college's central intellectual and social hub. The Athenaeum hosts speakers four nights a week, and also serves daily afternoon tea in its library, featuring chocolate-covered strawberries and pastries. Afternoon tea is free to students, faculty and staff. The Athenaeum has hosted such speakers as former President Bill Clinton, Archbishop Desmond Tutu of South Africa, former Speaker of the House Newt Gingrich, authors Gore Vidal and Salman Rushdie, cybernetics expert Kevin Warwick, former Attorney General Janet Reno, filmmaker Spike Lee, environmentalist Robert F. Kennedy Jr., former Prime Minister of Israel Ehud Barak, The New York Times columnist Thomas Friedman, Supreme Court Justice Antonin Scalia, U2 frontman and activist Bono, CNN journalist Anderson Cooper, former Deputy White House Chief of Staff Karl Rove, former Senate Majority Leader Tom Daschle, House Minority Leader Kevin McCarthy, New York Times columnist Maureen Dowd, Harvard Professor Danielle Allen, former Secretary of Homeland Security Michael Chertoff, former Secretary of State Condoleezza Rice, retired U.S. Army General Stanley A. McChrystal and former governor of Massachusetts and 2012 presidential candidate Mitt Romney.

Housing 
As a residential community, student life is centered on campus with 96% of students living on campus; four years of housing is guaranteed. Claremont's dorms are divided into three regions: North Quad, Mid Quad, and South Quad. In addition, the student apartments sit on the East edge of campus, and are occupied primarily by seniors. All dorm rooms are attended to by housekeeping staff every week. North Quad is made up of Appleby, Boswell, Green and Wohlford Halls, which were the campus's first dorms. In north quad, every room opens to the outdoors instead of opening to an interior hallway. North quad rooms are all doubles grouped into suites of four rooms that share a bathroom.

CMC's Mid Quad is home to Beckett, Berger, Benson, Phillips, Crown, Marks and Claremont Halls, which feature long interior corridors, double and single rooms, large shared-bathroom facilities and all-dorm lounge areas. Berger, Claremont and Benson Halls are connected, and make up a larger building known on campus as BCB. As of 2022, Claremont Hall has been renamned to Valach Hall, therefore changing BCB into BVB. 

The tallest buildings in Claremont are "The Towers", Auen, Fawcett, and Stark Halls, which make up South Quad. Each tower has seven floors with approximately twelve students per floor. Each floor has a common area and a large shared bathroom, while there is also an all-dorm lounge area on the ground floor. Stark Hall, the newest of the South Quad dorms, is substance-free. Auen and Fawcett underwent complete interior renovations in the summer of 2008.

The Student Apartments lie to the east of the college's athletic facilities and to the west of Claremont Boulevard. Each apartment is divided into four bedrooms and two bathrooms. Until recently, half the apartments were reserved for men and half for women, and apartments were allotted based on credits. In any given year, most of CMC's 260–300 seniors can live in the apartments.

Living in the apartments is considered highly desirable amongst CMC's senior class. Seniors get the chance to live with three friends of their choice, and they also have the option to stay on a meal plan and eat at one of the 5-C dining halls, or cook for themselves. Apartment dwellers do not get the maid service of the dorms, but they do get a cable television hookup. Noise levels are more manageable, and tend to be quiet during much of the week and in the days leading up to thesis, and loud from Thursday to Saturday. Most parties and social events at the apartments take place between buildings.

Student government 
The Associated Students of Claremont McKenna College (ASCMC) is the official student government of Claremont McKenna College. ASCMC is composed of an executive board and a student senate. The executive board consists of both elected and appointed positions. It is chaired by the President, and meets weekly to discuss long-term projects and endeavors. Permanent committees led by members of executive board include the events team, the diversity & inclusion committee, and the residential life committee. Additionally, each class president has a cabinet to carry out class programming. The Senate is chaired by the executive vice president of ASCMC, and is tasked with passing resolutions to influence institutional policy, funding student-led initiatives, and bringing in administrators and other college stakeholders for town hall discussions. Senate has four standing committees: administrative affairs & appropriations (AAA), environmental affairs, campus improvements, and student engagement.

Affinity Groups 
CMC has a host of identity-based clubs and organizations, including 1 Gen, for first generation college students), Asian Pacific American Mentors, Black Student Associations, ¡Mi Gente! (for Latinx students), Sexuality and Gender Alliance, Women's Forum, and International Connect. These clubs and organizations host a variety of support programming and social events for students to participate in.

Student journalism 

CMC attracts many students with an interest in journalism. Its student publications include the following:
 The Student Life: The Student Life (abbreviated TSL) was founded in 1889. It is the oldest college paper in Southern California and the largest media organization at the Claremont Colleges, and is generally regarded as the colleges' publication of record. It prints weekly on Fridays, featuring news, opinions, lifestyle articles, and sports coverage of all five undergraduate Claremont Colleges. It is jointly funded by the 5C student governments.
 The Golden Antlers: The Golden Antlers is a satirical and humorous campus publication founded in 2012.  Although Claremont McKenna is its host, it is staffed by students from all five Claremont Colleges.
 The CMC Forum: The Forum is the oldest CMC-specific publication on campus. It features campus news, opinions, and lifestyle articles. Although originally a newspaper, the Forum is now solely an online news source.
 The Claremont Radius: The Claremont Radius is a student-founded, student-run, and student-intended online publication that aims to spark political discourse across campus by providing students of all political backgrounds the tools they need for effective debate and discussion on the big issues affecting our society. Founded in 2015, it seeks to provide bi-partisan coverage on issues it discusses.
  The Claremont Independent: The Independent, founded in 1996, is a magazine of conservative and libertarian writers that has frequently produced stories about the political culture of the Claremont Colleges that have been picked up by national conservative media outlets and drawn intense criticism from many students. It is funded entirely through private donations.

Athletics

Athletes from CMC compete alongside athletes from Harvey Mudd College and Scripps College as the Claremont-Mudd-Scripps Stags and Athenas. The teams participate in NCAA Division III in the Southern California Intercollegiate Athletic Conference. The mascot for the men's teams is Stanley the Stag, and the women's teams are the Athenas. Their colors are cardinal and gold. In 2016, a new 144,000 square-foot recreation facility, named the Roberts Pavilion, was completed.

Athletics history
According to the Division III Fall Learfield Director's Cup Standings for the 2016–2017 year, CMS ranks 12th among all Division III programs, and first among SCIAC colleges.

Sports
There are 21 men's and women's teams.

Men's sports

 Baseball
 Basketball
 Cross country
 Football
 Golf

 Soccer
 Swimming and diving
 Tennis
 Track and field
 Water polo

Women's sports

Basketball
Cross country
Golf
Lacrosse
Soccer
Softball

Swimming and diving
Tennis
Track and field
Volleyball
Water polo

Athletic facilities
 Baseball — Bill Arce Field
 Basketball and Volleyball — Roberts Pavilion
 Football and Lacrosse — John Zinda Field
 Softball — Softball Field
 Soccer — John Pritzlaff Field
 Swimming and Diving — Matt M. Axelrood Pool
 Tennis — Biszantz Family Tennis Center
 Track and Field — Burns Track Complex

Rivals
The other sports combination of the Claremont Colleges, and CMS' primary rival, is the team made up of Pomona College and Pitzer College known as the Pomona-Pitzer Sagehens (P-P).

Traditions 
 All incoming freshmen participate in W.O.A!, or "Welcome Orientation Adventure" W.O.A! is a student-run pre-orientation program.  Options have included backpacking, camping and rock-climbing at Yosemite, canoeing down the Colorado River and community service in Los Angeles. Each trip is led by current students. W.O.A.! allows incoming students to develop friendships and get a sense for the college community before the formal beginning of their college careers.
 The "Madrigal Feast" was an annual dinner held in the Marian Miner Cook Athenaeum. Both current students as well as alumni typically attended. Guests were treated to a medieval-themed feast, complete with wassail and a spirited musical performance put on by other students in medieval dress. This 26 year tradition was suspended in 2009.
 The Associated Students of Claremont McKenna College host a "Monte Carlo" night which doubles as the school's homecoming dance. This tradition dates back to 1949.

Several of Claremont McKenna College's traditions are water-related:
 At noon on the due dates of senior theses, the students turn in their theses to the registrar, after which they are given a bottle of champagne by the registrar. In recent years, the class president has provided the champagne. The students spend the remainder of the afternoon in the fountains at the school, drinking, singing, celebrating and enjoying the warm California sun.
At midnight of a student's birthday, their friends will throw them in the fountains in the center of campus while singing "Happy Birthday", a tradition known as "ponding".

The Consortium 

All seven colleges are part of the Claremont University Consortium, also known as "the 7 Cs". In addition there are over 3,500 faculty and staff and more than 2,500 courses available. 
Student life revolves around the colleges as they interact socially and also share seven dining halls, four main libraries and other facilities spread throughout the campuses.  Notable facilities include:
 Honnold/Mudd Library and the Libraries of the Claremont Colleges, the largest collection of any liberal arts college
 W.M. Keck Science Center
 Monsour Counseling Center
 Huntley Bookstore

Students attending Claremont McKenna can enroll in up to 2/3 of their classes at the other undergraduate colleges and can also major at any other college if the major is not offered at CMC. This is the general academic policy at the schools and is meant to give students the resources of a larger university while still maintaining the qualities of a small, liberal-arts college.

Research institutes 

CMC sponsors twelve different on-campus research institutes and centers. They seek to produce new research and publications while involving undergraduate students in rigorous academic work. 
 The Berger Institute for Work, Family and Children
 The Financial Economics Institute
 The Center for Human Rights Leadership
 The Family of Benjamin Z. Gould Center for Humanistic Studies
 The Keck Center for International and Strategic Studies
 The Kravis Lab for Social Impact
 The Kravis Leadership Institute
 The Lowe Institute of Political Economy
 The Roberts Environmental Center
 The Rose Institute of State and Local Government
 The Salvatori Center for the Study of Individual Freedom in the Modern World
 The Center for Innovation and Entrepreneurship

Fundraising 

Claremont McKenna completed the largest fundraising campaign ever initiated by a liberal arts college, raising $635 million. The campaign for Claremont McKenna fulfilled for commitments in five priorities:
 $110 million for students: need-based financial aid and merit scholarships, internships, research, speaker series and other experiences
 $110 million for faculty: chairs, research and new curricula
 $100 million for facilities: new buildings, renovations and master planning projects
 $200 million for the Robert Day Scholars Program
 $80 million for The Fund for CMC: operating costs

As part of the campaign, the college built the Kravis Center, an academic building that includes classrooms, faculty offices and research areas. The building, designed by Rafael Viñoly, was completed in 2011. It is named after 1967 alumnus Henry Kravis of Kohlberg Kravis Roberts who donated $75 million for the building.

Notable alumni and faculty 

Notable alumni include:
 Political consultant Thomas B. Hofeller
 Former Chairman and CEO of TCW Group Robert Day (1965)
 Founding partner of Kohlberg Kravis Roberts & Co. (KKR) George Roberts (1966)
 Chairman and CEO of Abercrombie & Fitch Co. Michael S. Jeffries (1966)
 Founding partner of Kohlberg Kravis Roberts & Co. (KKR) Henry Kravis (1967)
 60th Chaplain of the United States House of Representatives, Patrick J. Conroy (1972)
 California Congressman and House Rules Committee Chairman David Dreier (1975)
59th Mayor of Dallas, Texas and former CEO of Kaplan, Inc. Tom Leppert (1977)
 Founder of Perella Weinberg Partners and former head of European Markets at Goldman Sachs, Peter Weinberg (1979)
 Chief Investment Officer of Cascade Investment and the Bill & Melinda Gates Foundation Michael Larson (1980)
 S&P Global President and CEO Douglas Peterson (1980)
 Co-Director of the Center on Work, Technology, and Organization at Stanford University, Pamela J. Hinds (1982)
 Governor of Montana Steve Bullock (1988)
CEO of Accenture Julie Sweet (1989)
New York Times White House correspondent Michael D. Shear (1990)
Social entrepreneur and founder of Ethos Water Peter Thum (1990)
Dean of University of Iowa College of Engineering Harriet B. Nemhard (1991)
CEO of Samba TV and co-founder of BitTorrent, Inc. Ashwin Navin (1999)
Entrepreneur Daniel Kan, founder and CPO of Cruise (2009)
 Anti-abortion activist David Daleiden (2010)
 Actor and comedian Robin Williams (did not graduate)
Los Angeles City Attorney Michael Feuer (transferred)

Notable faculty include:
 Political scientist Minxin Pei
 Political scientist Ward Elliott
Senior Economist at the Presidential Council of Economic Advisers Eric Helland
Charles Kesler, noted conservative scholar
 Arabic scholar Bassam Frangieh
 Author Jamaica Kincaid
Political scientist Ken Miller
Historian Wendy Lower
Psychologist Diane Helpern
Political scientist and environmental economist William Ascher
Presidential speechwriter and comedian Mort Sahl
German popular historian Golo Mann
Government consultant and felon Alan Heslop, founding director of the Rose Institute and former dean of faculty

References

External links 

 
Website of The Student Life, the 5C newspaper
Official athletics website
 

 
Universities and colleges in Los Angeles County, California
Educational institutions established in 1946
Schools accredited by the Western Association of Schools and Colleges
San Gabriel Valley
1946 establishments in California
Liberal arts colleges in California
Conservatism in the United States
Private universities and colleges in California